Gamero is a surname. Notable people with the surname include:

Alberto Gamero (born 1964), Colombian football manager and former player
Benjamín Muñoz Gamero (1817–1851), Chilean naval officer and politician
Franco Gamero (born 1990), Puerto Rican footballer
Isabel Bayón Gamero (born 1969), Spanish flamenco dancer, choreographer and teacher of flamenco dance
José Ramírez Gamero, Mexican politician
Lucila Gamero de Medina (1873–1964), Honduran romantic novelist
Manuel de Adalid y Gamero (1872–1947), Honduran composer
Pedro Gamero del Castillo (1910–1984), Spanish politician